Rainow is a civil parish in Cheshire East, England. It contains 69 buildings that are recorded in the National Heritage List for England as designated listed buildings.  Of these, three are listed at Grade II*, the middle grade, and the others are at Grade II.  Apart from the village of Rainow, the parish is now rural, although in the past there has been industry in the form of small mills.  One of the listed buildings is a former water mill, but most are country houses and associated structures, smaller houses and cottages, and farmhouses with farm buildings.  Otherwise the listed buildings are milestones, mile posts, boundary stones, weirs, a bridge, a folly, stocks, and two churches.

Key

Buildings

See also

Listed buildings in Bollington
Listed buildings in Higher Hurdsfield
Listed buildings in Kettleshulme
Listed buildings in Lyme Handley
Listed buildings in Macclesfield
Listed buildings in Macclesfield Forest and Wildboarclough
Listed buildings in Pott Shrigley

References
Citations

Sources

 

 

 

Listed buildings in the Borough of Cheshire East
Lists of listed buildings in Cheshire